This is a list of museums in Nigeria.

Benin City National Museum
Old Residency Museum
 Museum of Fawaaz Rocks
 Slave Trade Museum Calabar
Esiẹ Museum
Gidan Makama Museum Kano
Jos Museum
Kaduna Museum
Kanta Museum
National Gallery of Modern Art, Lagos
Nigerian National Museum
Oron Museum
Owo Museum
Tafawa Balewa Tomb
Uli Beier Museum
National Museum of Colonial History, Aba
War Museum, Umuahia
 Niger-Delta Museum
CRIMMD Museum Nigerian Photo History, Idimu, Lagos
*Yemisi Shyllon Museum of Art,Pan-Atlantic University, Lagos

See also

Tourism in Nigeria
Culture of Nigeria
List of museums

 
Museums
Nigeria
Museums
Museums
Nigeria